The 2024 AFC U-23 Asian Cup will be the 6th edition of the AFC U-23 Asian Cup (previously the AFC U-23 Championship before rebranding from 2021), the biennial international age-restricted football championship organised by the Asian Football Confederation (AFC) for the men's under-23 national teams of Asia.

The tournament will act as the AFC qualifiers for the 2024 Summer Olympics men's football tournament. The top three teams of the tournament would qualify for the Olympics in France as the AFC representatives while the fourth-best team will play an AFC–CAF play-off match for the qualification. A total of 16 teams will compete in the tournament. Saudi Arabia are the defending champions.

Host selection
Qatar has been selected as the host for this competition by the Asian Football Confederation Competitions Committee.

Qualification

Qualification matches are scheduled to be played in 2023.

Qualified teams

Venues
To be confirmed.

Squads

Players born on or after 1 January 2001 are eligible to compete in the tournament. Each team have to register a squad of minimum 18 players and maximum 23 players, minimum three of whom must have been goalkeepers (Regulations Article 26.3).

References

External links
, the-AFC.com

2024
2024 in Qatari sport
U-23 Asian Cup
2024 in youth association football
2020s in Asian sport
January 2024 sports events in Asia
Scheduled association football competitions
Football at the 2024 Summer Olympics – Men's qualification
International association football competitions hosted by Qatar
2024